Penygroes or Pen-y-groes may refer to any of several places in Wales:

Penygroes, Gwynedd
Penygroes railway station, a former station in the town
Penygroes, Pembrokeshire
Pen-y-groes, Carmarthenshire